is a 2D head-to-head fighting game with 3D graphics, originally released as a coin-operated arcade game for the Sony ZN hardware in 1996. It is a spin-off of the Street Fighter series co-produced by Capcom with Arika and was the first game in the series to feature 3D polygon graphics. It was followed by an updated arcade version titled Street Fighter EX Plus, as well as a PlayStation-exclusive home console version titled Street Fighter EX Plus α, both released in 1997. A Nintendo 64 version was also announced for release in 1997, but later cancelled.

Gameplay
The Street Fighter EX fighting system uses fighting systems from the Street Fighter II and Street Fighter Alpha series, but also has some original ones. In many ways, EX still plays like a 2D fighting game, but the linear plane in which characters fight often changes along a 3D arena. The game uses special moves and super combos familiar or similar to previous games in the series. Unlike in the Street Fighter Alpha titles or Darkstalkers, the EX series features a super meter with three separate sections, not levels, which is unique to this spinoff game series.

Aside from throwing the opponent or wearing away their health by using special moves, a way to fight blocking is the "Guard Break". The Guard Break is a move that, if it connects with the blocking opponent, breaks the block and makes the opponent dizzy. The Guard Break can be used at any time with one level of the Super Combo gauge. This is also a SF mechanic but in Alpha, the guard break simply results in an opening, while EX guard break is more like a stun.

A special move can be done after a regular move or another special move; this is called "Canceling". In the process of doing a Super Combo, another Super Combo can be performed. This is called "Super Canceling" and can be done with Super Combos. This allows a player to string multiple super combos together for monumental damage.

Characters
The original Street Fighter EX features 17 characters, growing to 23 for the home release. With a total of 18 new characters in the three games of the Street Fighter EX series, this represents the largest original set of characters introduced in a single Street Fighter series.

Versions

Street Fighter EX Plus
A few months after the original version of Street Fighter EX was released, an upgraded version titled Street Fighter EX Plus was released in arcades on March 31, 1997. In this version, all of the hidden time-released characters are available by default. This version also adds four new hidden characters, increasing the total number of characters to 21: Evil Ryu from Street Fighter Alpha 2, an alternate version of Hokuto named Bloody Hokuto, and two cyborgs named Cycloid-β and Cycloid-γ.

Street Fighter EX Plus α
The PlayStation version of the game, titled Street Fighter EX Plus Alpha and promoted as Street Fighter EX Plus α, was released on July 17, 1997. All of the characters from the arcade version of EX Plus are included, along with two characters exclusive to this version, increasing the total number of characters to 23: Dhalsim from Street Fighter II and Sakura from Street Fighter Alpha 2. In addition, there is a hidden bonus stage where the player has to smash barrels, similar to one of the three bonus stages from Street Fighter II.

The PlayStation version also includes several game modes in addition to the Arcade mode: a dedicated two-player Versus mode, Practice mode, Team Battle mode, Survival mode, Time Attack mode, and Watch mode where the player witnesses a match between two computer-controlled characters. The PlayStation version also includes an arranged soundtrack and CG animated endings for all of the characters.

Regional differences
The Japanese versions of both EX and EX Plus contain text-only epilogues which are displayed on-screen after the player defeats M. Bison in single-player mode. The PlayStation version features new epilogues (different from the ones featured in the arcade versions) in addition to FMV endings.

Development
Development of the game was headed by Akira Nishitani, best known for his work on Street Fighter II. Though the gaming media had widely perceived Capcom's first in-house polygonal fighting game, Star Gladiator, as a warm-up for their first polygonal Street Fighter game, Arika did not consult with the Star Gladiator team in making Street Fighter EX. Arika vice president Ichiro Mihara explained, "In specific terms, it's a different development line. In addition, technically, it's completely different. The know-how we're using for this 2D/3D fighting game has no relation to Star Gladiator. Fundamentally, Arika is not a subsidiary company of Capcom. ... Some people may be under the impression that as we came from Capcom, there's some sort of link between us but in reality it's a different team making a different game. The concept is new and the know-how is new."

Music
The music was written by former Namco composers, Takayuki Aihara, Shinji Hosoe, and Ayako Saso. The themes are predominantly jazz fusion, with rock and electronic dance music elements. Entitled Street Fighter EX－SCITRON 1500 SERIES, the complete 20-track CD album was released on February 21, 1997 by Pony Canyon, complete with a 19-track voice collection. The 13-track live band CD Street Fighter EX Arrange Sound Trax was released on March 5, 1997, with a drama CD released on March 21 of the same year.

Reception

Critical reaction

A reviewer for Next Generation commended Capcom for bringing the Street Fighter series into 3D, but judged Street Fighter EX to be an ultimately failed attempt. He remarked that while the characters are evenly balanced and have a handful of innovative moves, "The game plays more like a distant cousin to the Street Fighter series" and is simply not as fun. He also found the animations and backgrounds to not be up to Street Fighter standards.

The expanded PlayStation version was much more positively received. Next Generation explained that it had far exceeded the arcade version by adding new characters and new gameplay modes, as well as correcting the feel, and called it "an outstanding title even non-SF devotees will enjoy." Both Next Generation and GameSpot assured readers that the look of the old characters had been faithfully translated to polygonal form, and critics generally approved of the series' transition to polygonal graphics. Dan Hsu of Electronic Gaming Monthly said it was "What should've been called Street Fighter III" rather than the sprite-based game released under that name, and co-reviewer Howard Grossman said it "has the attraction of 3-D looks, 2-D playability and great options!" GameSpot described it as "a fun game with great gameplay, better than average aesthetics, and a large number of characters" and "a 3D Street Fighter game worthy of its heritage." The Official UK PlayStation Magazine said that the "gameplay is as recognisable as the Taj Mahal", and that it was "the most fun we've ever had with Streetfighting since Turbo", rating the lifespan as 10/10. They concluded "this is like a second honeymoon. The true master of martial arts games remains unrivalled." IGNs Jason Boor stated "this is one of the best Street Fighters I've ever played, and I think it's a good switch. It's still a 2D fighter, but it looks a whole lot better." GamePro similarly said that it "adds a cool polygonal 3D look to the classic game while keeping the fun, basic gameplay that's made the series one of the fighting genre's all-time best."

Critics also overwhelmingly liked the new characters the game introduced, with Next Generation describing them as "very playable and distinct" and Ed Lomas writing in Computer and Video Games that they "start to grow on you before long - especially Skullo." The most common reservation critics had was that the game did not do quite enough to change up the technique from previous Street Fighter games. Hsu said that while there were enough changes in the moves and timing to challenge Street Fighter veterans, he was disappointed that the new characters all used the traditional fireball and dragon punch joypad motions, and GamePro likewise opined that it made them feel like "Ken and Ryu clones."

The PlayStation version was a runner-up for "Fighting Game of the Year" (behind Street Fighter Collection) at Electronic Gaming Monthlys 1997 Editors' Choice Awards. In 1998 PlayStation: The Official Magazine listed it as number 9 on their "best PlayStation games of all time".

Commercial
In Japan, Game Machine listed Street Fighter EX on their February 15, 1997 issue as being the second most-successful arcade game of the month. Game Machine also listed Street Fighter EX Plus on their May 15, 1997 issue as being the sixth most-successful arcade game of the month. In North America, the arcade version saw limited distribution.

The PlayStation version sold over 400,000 total copies worldwide after its first year on sale, qualifying for the Platinum Range.

Sequels
A sequel to Street Fighter EX, Street Fighter EX2, was released on May 26, 1998. It was also followed by an upgraded version titled Street Fighter EX2 Plus, which was released in arcades and ported to the PlayStation in 1999. The third game in the series, Street Fighter EX3, was released exclusively for the PlayStation 2 on March 4, 2000. The Street Fighter EX games all run at a vertical resolution of 480 lines, which made them the only Street Fighter games to run at a definition above 256 lines until the release of Street Fighter IV (which also has 3D graphics) in 2008.

Both Allen Snider and Blair Dane appear in Arika's arcade exclusive fighting game, Fighting Layer, released in Japan by Namco in 1998.

In early 2017, Arika announced that a new fighting game was in development with the working title "Arika EX". On April 1, 2017, a teaser for a new title featuring the Street Fighter EX characters was released, which was initially believed to be an April Fool's joke. It was later revealed that the game was indeed in development and that more information would be revealed during EVO 2017. The game was released in June 2018 under the name Fighting EX Layer.

References

External links

 Arika - the developers of the Street Fighter EX series.
J-pop.com interview with Akira Nishitani about Street Fighter EX

1996 video games
Arcade video games
Arika games
PlayStation (console) games
Street Fighter games
Fighting games
2D fighting games
Video game spin-offs
Video games developed in Japan
Video games with 2.5D graphics
Video games with AI-versus-AI modes
Video games with alternate endings
Video games set in Thailand
Video games set in the Middle East
Video games set in Russia
Video games set in Mexico
Video games set in India
Video games set in the United States
Video games set in Japan
Video games set in China
Video games scored by Shinji Hosoe
Video games with alternative versions
Cancelled Nintendo 64 games